Cole Haan is an American brand of men's and women's footwear and accessories that serves markets worldwide. The company was founded in Chicago, Illinois in 1928. Cole Haan currently has its headquarters in both New York City and Greenland, New Hampshire, United States.

History

The company name comes from founders Trafton Cole and Eddie Haan, and was originally named “Cole, Rood & Haan” when the company was strictly a men's footwear label. Today it offers many products, including men's and women's dress and casual footwear, belts, hosiery, handbags, gloves, scarves, hats, outerwear, and sunglasses.

Cole Haan was sold to a group of partners headed by George Denney in 1975. These executives built upon the foundation established by Cole and Haan over the following decade, transforming the label into one of the leading U.S. footwear brands. They launched a retail division in 1982, which comprised 40 plus  stores worldwide and cumulative annual sales of nearly $70 million by 1996.

Nike, Inc. purchased Cole Haan in 1988. Nike announced on May 31, 2012, that it was divesting of Cole Haan and Umbro to focus on the Nike brand and other complementary brands.

Cole Haan was bought by private equity firm Apax Partners Worldwide LLP for $570 million on November 16, 2012. Since then the brand has its headquarters in Greenland, New Hampshire, and its design center in New York City. Jack A. Boys is its current CEO.

The Cole Haan Maine headquarters relocated from Yarmouth to Scarborough in summer 2011. In October 2013 it was announced that the headquarters would relocate to Greenland, New Hampshire.

Retail stores
Cole Haan has over 300 stores with numerous locations in the Americas, Asia, and the Middle East. Cole Haan has one store in South Africa, and other than one location in Istanbul, does not have any other locations in Europe, nor any in Australia and New Zealand. Cole Haan sells its products worldwide through its own website and websites operated by international distribution partners.

Cole Haan products are also sold at retailers such as Nordstrom, Shoe Carnival, Zappos, Macy's, Lord & Taylor, Neiman Marcus, Hudson's Bay Company and other department stores and independent stores in the United States, as well as through its own outlet stores found in outlet malls throughout the country.

Sustainability
On February 25, 2008, the company announced it would discontinue using real animal fur in its products for business and sustainability reasons.

Marketing
Cole Haan chose Russian tennis star Maria Sharapova to headline its Spring 2009 and Fall 2009 advertising campaigns.

Collaborations
Cole Haan has done collaborations with designers, athletes, and tastemakers including a men's footwear capsule collection with CFDA-nominated menswear designer Todd Snyder and a collection of women's ballet flats designed in partnership with three dancers of New York City Ballet, Sara Mearns, Megan Fairchild, and Gretchen Smith.

References

External links

 

Shoe companies of the United States
Shoe brands
Eyewear companies of the United States
Eyewear brands of the United States
Manufacturing companies based in New Hampshire
Companies based in Rockingham County, New Hampshire
Clothing companies established in 1928
Retail companies established in 1982
1928 establishments in Illinois
1988 mergers and acquisitions
2012 mergers and acquisitions
Greenland, New Hampshire
Apax Partners companies